Cliff Burvill (26 March 1937 – 14 January 2021) was an Australian cyclist. He competed in the team pursuit event at the 1956 Summer Olympics. Burvill set the fastest time in the amateur Goulburn to Sydney Classic in 1958 run in reverse direction from Enfield to Goulburn.

Burvill died on 14 January 2021, after a fall at the criterium circuit in Byron Bay.

References

External links
 

1937 births
2021 deaths
Australian male cyclists
Olympic cyclists of Australia
Cyclists at the 1956 Summer Olympics
Australian track cyclists
Place of birth missing
Accidental deaths from falls
People from Coffs Harbour
Cyclists from New South Wales